S. R. Jeyadurai (born 19 March 1969) is an Indian politician belonging to the Dravida Munnetra Kazhagam party. He was a former Member of Parliament, representing Thoothukkudi constituency in the Lok Sabha (the lower house of India's Parliament) from 2009 to 2014.

Jeyadurai was born in 1969, in Mangalapuram, Thoothukudi. He holds a B.Sc. degree, and is an alumnus of the Pope's College, Sawyerpuram. He got married in 1999, and has five daughters. Currently he is living in Chennai.

References 

Living people
India MPs 2009–2014
Dravida Munnetra Kazhagam politicians
Lok Sabha members from Tamil Nadu
1969 births
People from Thoothukudi district